Nathalia Timberg (born 5 August 1929) is a Brazilian actress. She is celebrated as one of the best and most well known Brazilian actresses of cinema, theater and television.

Biography 
Nathalia was born in Rio de Janeiro, Brazil. Of Jewish origin, she is the daughter of a Polish father and a Belgian mother.

Selected filmography
 A Muralha (1968)
 A Sucessora (1978)
 Pantanal (1990)
 Éramos Seis (1994)
 Força de um Desejo (1999)
 Porto dos Milagres (2001)
 O Quinto dos Infernos (2002)
 Celebridade (2003)
 Páginas da Vida (2006)
 Insensato Coração (2011)
 Amor à Vida (2013)
 Babilônia (2015)

References

External links

1929 births
Living people
Actresses from Rio de Janeiro (city)
Brazilian people of Belgian descent
Brazilian people of Polish descent
Brazilian television actresses
Brazilian telenovela actresses
Brazilian film actresses
20th-century Brazilian actresses
21st-century Brazilian actresses
Federal University of Rio de Janeiro alumni